Madeleine Carruzzo (born 1956 in Sion, Switzerland) is a Swiss violinist. Since 1 September 1982 she has been a member of the Berlin Philharmonic. She was the first female member of the orchestra.

Life
Madeleine Carruzzo first received guitar lessons and later came to the violin. She graduated from the Hochschule für Musik Detmold where she studied under Tibor Varga.

After studying, she applied to the Zurich Chamber Orchestra as the concertmaster and to the Berlin Philharmonic as an ensemble member. While she was rejected in Switzerland, because at that time a female was not wanted in the position of concertmaster, she received an invitation from the Berlin Philharmonic to an audition on 23 June 1982. There, she succeeded, in competition with 12 other players.

Apart from her work with the Berlin Philharmonic, Madeleine Carruzzo is also active in various chamber music ensembles, including the Metropolis Ensemble Berlin, the Venus Ensemble, and the Philharmonic Streichersolisten.

External links
 Madeleine Carruzzo at the official site of the Berliner Philharmonic
 Madeleine Carruzzo at discogs.com

References

1956 births
Living people
Women classical violinists
Hochschule für Musik Detmold alumni
20th-century classical violinists
21st-century classical violinists
People from Sion, Switzerland
Swiss violinists
20th-century women musicians
21st-century women musicians